Luis Usera Bugallal (8 July 1890 – 7 August 1958) was a Spanish lawyer and businessman who was the 7th president of Real Madrid from 1930 until 31 May 1935.

References

1890 births
1958 deaths
People from Talavera de la Reina
20th-century Spanish lawyers
20th-century Spanish businesspeople
Real Madrid CF presidents
Members of the Congress of Deputies of the Spanish Restoration